After the Rain is an album by Norwegian jazz guitarist Terje Rypdal recorded in 1976 and released on the ECM label.

Reception
The Allmusic review awarded the album 4 stars.

Track listing
All compositions by Terje Rypdal
 "Autumn Breeze" - 4:36 
 "Air" - 4:28 
 "Now and Then" - 2:53 
 "Wind" - 1:26 
 "After the Rain" - 6:08 
 "Kjare Maren" - 4:12 
 "Little Bell" - 1:38 
 "Vintage Year" - 3:49 
 "Multer" - 2:55 
 "Like a Child, Like a Song" - 6:04 
Recorded at the Talent Studios in Oslo, Norway in August 1976

Personnel
Terje Rypdal — acoustic guitar, electric guitar, synthesizer, piano, electric piano, soprano saxophone, flute, bells, tubular bells 
Inger Lise Rypdal — vocals

References

ECM Records albums
Terje Rypdal albums
1976 albums
Albums produced by Manfred Eicher